Itaberá is a municipality in the state of São Paulo in Brazil. The population is 17,480 (2020 est.) in an area of 1111 km². The elevation is 651 m. This place-name comes from the Tupi language and means "shining stone".

References

Municipalities in São Paulo (state)